Nikita Mandryka (20 October 1940 – 13 June 2021) was a French cartoonist.

He started drawing in the Vaillant magazine, before moving to Pilote in 1967, and then created L'Écho des savanes along with Claire Bretécher and Marcel Gotlib in 1972. He left this magazine in 1979, going back to Pilote as editorial director. His major and better known works are the Concombre masqué (The Masked Cucumber) stories. He won the Grand Prix de la ville d'Angoulême in 1994.

Awards and honors
1988: Angoulême International Comics Festival Award for Best Promotional Comic
1994: Grand Prix de la ville d'Angoulême
2005: Angoulême International Comics Festival Award for Inheritance
 Asteroid 157747 Mandryka is named after Nikita Mandryka.

Works

Les aventures potagères du Concombre masqué (from 1975 to 2006).
Clopinettes (drawing), with Gotlib (story), Dargaud, 1974.
Mandryka, Éditions du Fromage, 1976.
Le retour du refoulé, Éditions du Fromage, 1977, coll. « L'Écho des Savanes ».
Les Minuscules, Éditions du Fromage :
Entre chien et chat, 1979.
Lob de la Jungle (drawing), with Jacques Lob (story), Les Humanoïdes Associés, 1980.
Alice (story), with Riverstone (drawing), Dargaud, 1985.
Le type au Reuri, Albin Michel, 1987.
La Horde - Mandryka chez Freud, Z'éditions, 1994.
Les animaux sont-ils des bêtes ? (drawing), with Fritax (story), P&T Production, 1995.
Y'a plus de limites !, Albin Michel, 1996.
Les Gardiens du Maser (story), with Massimiliano Frezzato (story and drawing), Éditions USA :
4. La Tour de Fer, 2000.
5. Le Bout du Monde, 2003.
6. Le Village Perdu, 2005.

References

External links
 Mandryka biography on Lambiek Comiclopedia
 Le Concombre masqué official site

1940 births
2021 deaths
People from Bizerte
French cartoonists
French comics artists
French people of Russian descent
Grand Prix de la ville d'Angoulême winners